Stephen Batchelor (born 7 April 1953) is a Scottish Buddhist author and teacher, writing books and articles on Buddhist topics and leading meditation retreats throughout the world. He is a noted proponent of agnostic or secular Buddhism.

Biography 

Batchelor was born in Dundee, Scotland in 1953. When he was three, his family relocated briefly to Toronto, Ontario, Canada, where his parents separated. He returned with his mother Phyllis (b. 1913) to England, where he was raised in a humanist environment with his younger brother David in Watford, Hertfordshire. After completing his secondary education at Watford Grammar School, in February 1972, at the age of eighteen, he embarked on an overland journey which eventually led him to India. He settled in Dharamsala, the capital-in-exile of the Dalai Lama, and studied with Geshé Ngawang Dhargyey at the Library of Tibetan Works and Archives. He was ordained as a novice monk in the Gelug tradition in 1974. A few months after ordination, he sat a ten-day Vipassana meditation retreat with the Indian teacher S.N. Goenka, which proved a lasting influence on his practice, and aroused his curiosity about other traditions of Buddhism.

He left India in 1975 in order to study Tibetan Buddhist philosophy and doctrine under the guidance of Geshe Rabten, first at the Tibet Institute Rikon then in Le Mont-Pèlerin (both in Switzerland), where he helped Geshé Rabten to establish the Tharpa Choeling (now Rabten Choeling). The next year he received full ordination as a monk. In 1979 he moved to Germany as a translator for Geshé Thubten Ngawang at the Tibetisches Institut, Hamburg.

In April 1981 Batchelor travelled to Songgwangsa Monastery in South Korea to train in Zen Buddhism under the guidance of Kusan Sunim. At the monastery, he met Martine Fages, a Frenchwoman who had ordained as a nun in 1975. He remained in Korea until the autumn of 1984, when he left for a pilgrimage to Buddhist sites in Japan, China and Tibet.

Following the death of Kusan Sunim, Batchelor and Martine Fages laicised in February 1985 and married in Hong Kong, then returned to England and joined the Sharpham North Community near Totnes, Devon. Over the course of the next fifteen years Batchelor lived at Sharpham, he became coordinator of the Sharpham Trust (1992) and co-founder of the Sharpham College for Buddhist Studies and Contemporary Enquiry (1996). Throughout this period he worked as a Buddhist chaplain at Channings Wood Prison. From 1990 he has been a Guiding Teacher at Gaia House meditation centre in Devon and since 1992 a contributing editor of Tricycle: The Buddhist Review. In August 2000, he and Martine moved to Aquitaine, France, where they live in a village near Bordeaux.

As a lay Buddhist author, teacher and self-designated scholar, he has increasingly turned his attention to the earliest teachings of Buddhism as recorded in the Pali canon. He also has increasingly turned his attention to Hellenistic philosophies, most particularly the skeptical philosophy of Pyrrhonism and Montaigne's approach to Pyrrhonism.

Batchelor is a member of the core faculty of Bodhi College, which focuses on interpreting the early texts of Buddhism, such as the Pali Canon, in a manner that is applicable to the modern world. He is also a member of the Center for Pragmatic Buddhism's Advisory Board.

Bibliography 
 Batchelor, Stephen. Alone with Others: An Existential Approach to Buddhism. Foreword by John Blofeld. Grove Press, 1983 .
 Batchelor, Stephen. Flight: An Existential Conception of Buddhism. Buddhist Publication Society, Wheel Publication No. 316/317. 1984.
Kusan Sunim.  The Way of Korean Zen. Translated by Martine Fages Batchelor. Edited with an introduction by Stephen Batchelor. Weatherhill, 1985.  . (2nd Revised Edition: Weatherhill, 2009. .)
Batchelor, Stephen (editor). The Jewel in the Lotus: A Guide to the Buddhist Traditions of Tibet. Wisdom Publications,  1986. .
 Batchelor, Stephen. The Tibet Guide. Foreword by the Dalai Lama. Wisdom Publications, 1987. . (Revised edition: The Tibet Guide: Central and Western Tibet. Wisdom Publications, 1998. .)
 Batchelor, Stephen. The Faith to Doubt: Glimpses of Buddhist Uncertainty. Parallax Press, 1990. .
 Batchelor, Stephen. Buddhism Without Beliefs. Riverhead Books, 1997. .
Watson, Gay, Stephen Batchelor and Guy Claxton (editors). The Psychology of Awakening: Buddhism, Science, and Our Day-to-Day Lives. Weiser Books, 2000. .
Batchelor, Martine. Meditation for Life. Photography by Stephen Batchelor. Wisdom Publications, 2001. .
Mackenzie, Vicki. "Life as a Question, Not as a Fact: Stephen Batchelor – author, teacher and skeptic." Why Buddhism? Westerners in Search of Wisdom. HarperCollins, 2003. . pp. 142–62.
Batchelor, Stephen. Living with the Devil: A Meditation on Good and Evil.. Penguin Books/Riverhead Books, 2005. 
Batchelor, Stephen. Confession of a Buddhist Atheist. Random House, 2010. .
 Batchelor, Stephen. The Awakening of the West: The Encounter of Buddhism and Western Culture. Foreword by the Dalai Lama. Echo Point Books & Media, 2011. .
 Batchelor, Stephen. "A Secular Buddhism". Journal of Global Buddhism 13 (2012):87-107
 Batchelor, Stephen. After Buddhism: Rethinking the Dharma for a Secular Age. Yale University Press, 2015.
 Batchelor, Stephen. Secular Buddhism: Imagining the Dharma in an Uncertain World. Yale University Press, 2017. 
 Batchelor, Martine and Batchelor, Stephen. What is this? Ancient questions for modern minds. Tuwhiri, 2019. 
 Batchelor, Stephen. The Art of Solitude. Yale University Press, 2020.

Translations by Stephen Batchelor 
 Shantideva. A Guide to the Bodhisattva's Way of Life.  Translated by Stephen Batchelor. Library of Tibetan Works and Archives, 1979. .
Rabten, Geshé. Echoes of Voidness. Translated and edited by Stephen Batchelor. Wisdom Publications, 1983. 
Rabten, Geshé. Song of the Profound View. Translated and annotated by Stephen Batchelor. Wisdom Publications, 1989. .
Batchelor, Stephen. Verses from the Center: A Buddhist Vision of the Sublime. Riverhead Books, 2001. .  This is a translation of the Mūlamadhyamakakārikā (Fundamental Verses on the Middle Way) by Nagarjuna.

Libretto 
MĀRA: A CHAMBER OPERA on good and evil. Libretto by Stephen Batchelor, Music by Sherry Woods. 2017.

See also 
Martine Batchelor
Buddhism in Europe
Christopher Titmuss
Secular Buddhism

References

External links 
 
 Official biography
 The Māra Opera Project
 Downloadable talks at Dharmaseed and Audiodharma

Interviews and documentaries 
 Short documentary film about Stephen Batchelor made for Netherlands TV. April 2008. English with Dutch subtitles.
 TV interview on ABC News, 9 March 2010.
 "Starting from Scratch: A talk with Stephen Batchelor"Tricycle: The Buddhist Review. 2010. Retrieved 2010-03-16.
 Online video of a talk based on Confession of a Buddhist Atheist. Fora.tv, 19 March 2010.
 Audio Interview Series on Buddhist Geeks

Stephen Batchelor.

1953 births
Living people
Converts to Buddhism from atheism or agnosticism
Scottish atheists
French atheists
Scottish Buddhists
French Buddhists
Buddhist writers
British scholars of Buddhism
Students of S. N. Goenka
Converts to Buddhism
Writers from Dundee
Buddhism and atheism
Librettists
Buddhist music